"Eddie's Gun" is the debut single of English indie rock band the Kooks, released in the United Kingdom on 11 July 2005. A different version appears on the band's debut album, Inside In/Inside Out (2006). The song is a tongue-in-cheek look at erectile dysfunction, not a tale of lead singer Luke Pritchard's unrequited love for ex-girlfriend Katie Melua, as some (including music magazine NME) have suggested.

Other versions
An alternative version of the song, titled "Eddie's Gun- 2005 Version" is featured on The Kooks' album The Best of... So Far.

Track listings
7-inch (VS2000)
 "Eddie's Gun" – 2:13
 "Bus Song" – 2:02

CD (VSCDT2000)
 "Eddie's Gun" – 2:13
 "California" (Originally by Mason Jennings) – 2:08

Charts

References

2005 debut singles
2005 songs
The Kooks songs
Virgin Records singles